Parliamentary elections were held in North Korea on 26 July 1998. 687 deputies were elected to the tenth Supreme People's Assembly. There was only one nominated candidate per constituency - 687 candidates for 687 seats. According to the state news agency KCNA, the turnout rate was 99.85%, and 100% of participating voters cast their ballots in favour of the registered candidates. About two thirds of the deputies were new, and deputies with a military background reportedly doubled in number. Kim Jong-il was unanimously elected in constituency n°666. According to a Rodong Sinmun editorial, this proved "how deep the Korean people's trust in Kim Jong Il is and how powerful and solid the monolithic unity of the people around him in one thought and purpose and with moral obligation is."

The election was three years overdue, the latest election having been in 1990. The planned 1995 elections were cancelled due to a period of mourning instituted after the death of Kim Il-sung. In its first session on 5 September 1998, the newly elected parliament amended laws to reflect the succession of Kim Jong-il.

Numerological significance of the number 666 in North korean politics
Kim Jong-il's seat was the 666th seat, and in North Korea, political meanings are imparted to numbers of the constituencies for cult of personality purposes. Rodong Shinmun stated in its 1999 opinion piece "666: Legend of the Great Man" that the number is meaningful in the sense that the cube of 6 is 216, which coincides with Kim Jong-il's birthday, 16 February, and emphasizes that North Korea is the 6th state to exist in the Korean peninsula.

Results

Elected members
The following were elected as members of parliament:

 Electoral District: Kim Bok-nam
 Electoral District: Kim Yong-bok
 Electoral District: Ryu Chung-ryol
 Electoral District: Kang Jun-ho
 Electoral District: Kim Ryong-yon
 Electoral District: Ryu Mi-yong
 Electoral District: Chu Chang-hui
 Electoral District: Chon Chin-su
 Electoral District: Chon Kwang-chun
 Electoral District: Ri Sung-thaek
 Electoral District: Jong Myong-ok
 Electoral District: Ryang Man-kil
 Electoral District: Im Man-sun
 Electoral District: Ri Sun-im
 Electoral District: Pak Yun-hwal
 Electoral District: Yu Il-ung
 Electoral District: Kim In-hwa
 Electoral District: Kim Chong-ku
 Electoral District: Hong Yong-kil
 Electoral District: Song Chun-sik
 Electoral District: Ham Song-to
 Electoral District: Kim Kon-il
 Electoral District: Ri Sung-hui
 Electoral District: Kang Hyong-mo
 Electoral District: Kim Song-hi
 Electoral District: Ho Jong-suk
 Electoral District: Chi Yong-chun
 Electoral District: Kang Tok-su
 Electoral District: Ri Hwa-sun
 Electoral District: Ri Won-jae
 Electoral District: Chu Jong-kyong
 Electoral District: Ri Pyong-kap
 Electoral District: 
 Electoral District: Kim Pyong-bok
 Electoral District: Kang Thae-mu
 Electoral District: Kang Hyon-su
 Electoral District: Chu Sun-ok
 Electoral District: Kim Ki-u
 Electoral District: Kim Chang-sik
 Electoral District: Pak Kwan-o
 Electoral District: Sim Thae-kyun
 Electoral District: Pak Ki-so
 Electoral District: Kim Hwa-suk
 Electoral District: Kim Song-ung
 Electoral District: Ri Hwa-sil
 Electoral District: Kim Nung-sun
 Electoral District: Kye Su-kun
 Electoral District: Pak Yong-son
 Electoral District: Hong So-hon
 Electoral District: Cho Kyong-sun
 Electoral District: Kim Jong
 Electoral District: Ri Thae-il
 Electoral District: Ok Pong-rin
 Electoral District: Kim Bok-sil
 Electoral District: Kwon Tong-hwa
 Electoral District: Kim SIho
 Electoral District: Thae Son-hui
 Electoral District: Kim Se-myong
 Electoral District: Ri Son-sil
 Electoral District: Kim Ho-je
 Electoral District: Ri Tan
 Electoral District: Han Chang-ryol
 Electoral District: Ryu Chun-ok
 Electoral District: Ri Won-sik
 Electoral District: Chon Ku-kang
 Electoral District: Kim In-nam
 Electoral District: Cho Yun-je
 Electoral District: Han Jae-rok
 Electoral District: Sim Myong-su
 Electoral District: Kim Yong-chu
 Electoral District: Kim Bo-pi
 Electoral District: Kim Song-kwon
 Electoral District: Kim Yu-il
 Electoral District: Rim Nam-su
 Electoral District: Kim Jong-suk
 Electoral District: Kim Chang-in
 Electoral District: Mun Sang-min
 Electoral District: Choe Hong-il
 Electoral District: Sin Tae-kyun
 Electoral District: Choe Jun-kun
 Electoral District: Kim Kuk-tae
 Electoral District: Ri Kwang-ho
 Electoral District: Chang Kum-tok
 Electoral District: Kim Yang-kon
 Electoral District: Tak Jong-suk
 Electoral District: Hwang Sun-hui
 Electoral District: Kim Yo-ung
 Electoral District: Kim Ui-mo
 Electoral District: Im Rok-jae
 Electoral District: Kim Man-song
 Electoral District: Kim Su-ik
 Electoral District: Han Yong-hye
 Electoral District: Kim Sang-ryong
 Electoral District: Choe Kwan-jun
 Electoral District: Paek In-jun
 Electoral District: Ro Pong-ho
 Electoral District: Ryom Hyon-so
 Electoral District: Ri U-ho
 Electoral District: Han Jong-hwa
 Electoral District: Jong Tong-uk
 Electoral District: Ro Ik-hwa
 Electoral District: Ro Jong-hui
 Electoral District: Choe Son-il
 Electoral District: Choe Pun-hui
 Electoral District: Mun Jae-chol
 Electoral District: Kim Chang-chu
 Electoral District: Jong Mun-san
 Electoral District: Ri Chun-son
 Electoral District: Kang Il-kwan
 Electoral District: Han Kwang-bok
 Electoral District: Kim Jung-rin
 Electoral District: Choe Ryong-ik
 Electoral District: Pyon Suk-yong
 Electoral District: Kang Hyon-bok
 Electoral District: Cho Bok-hui
 Electoral District: Ro Myong-kun
 Electoral District: Jang Song-thaek
 Electoral District: Yu Pom-sun
 Electoral District: Ri Mu-yong
 Electoral District: Mun Su-ok
 Electoral District: Ri Ung-won
 Electoral District: Pak Sung-kwon
 Electoral District: Rim Tong-ok
 Electoral District: Choe Su-hon
 Electoral District: Thae Hyong-chol
 Electoral District: Pak Yong-hun
 Electoral District: Yun Ung-su
 Electoral District: Kim Kwang-yong
 Electoral District: Chon Chong-ki
 Electoral District: Pak To-chun
 Electoral District: Kang Sok-chu
 Electoral District: Pak Son-phil
 Electoral District: An Myong-ok
 Electoral District: Kim Hui-yong
 Electoral District: Pak Yong-hun
 Electoral District: Kim Ok-ryon
 Electoral District: Chon Kwang-ryol
 Electoral District: Kim Jong-sil
 Electoral District: Ri Hwa-chu
 Electoral District: O Myong-il
 Electoral District: Kim Jong-hun
 Electoral District: Hyon Ryo-chin
 Electoral District: Hwang Se-pyong
 Electoral District: Jong Pyong-hak
 Electoral District: Ri Hi-il
 Electoral District: Pak Song-chol
 Electoral District: So Pyong-bok
 Electoral District: Sin Won-il
 Electoral District: Kim Ryong-thaek
 Electoral District: Kang Yong-thae
 Electoral District: Ri Kil-song
 Electoral District: Chon Jae-rok
 Electoral District: Song In-kil
 Electoral District: Ri Chun-ku
 Electoral District: Hong Song-nam
 Electoral District: Kim Chol-won
 Electoral District: Pang CHONGsu
 Electoral District: Cho Yong-hui
 Electoral District: Kim Myong-il
 Electoral District: Mun Jong-nam
 Electoral District: Song Hyon
 Electoral District: Ri Won-il
 Electoral District: Ri Kum-pom
 Electoral District: Cho Hui-yol
 Electoral District: Won Jong-sam
 Electoral District: Ra Yong-ran
 Electoral District: Song Thae-yon
 Electoral District: Kim Sok-hyon
 Electoral District: Kim Jong-kil
 Electoral District: Ri Chin-kyu
 Electoral District: Ryu Jae-myong
 Electoral District: Kim Sang-ok
 Electoral District: Pak Pong-chu
 Electoral District: Kwon Hyon-suk
 Electoral District: Kim Jae-hwa
 Electoral District: Han Kwang-bok
 Electoral District: Paek Hak-rim
 Electoral District: Kwak Pom-ki
 Electoral District: Ri Pong-ik
 Electoral District: Son SIwon
 Electoral District: Kim Hui-sam
 Electoral District: Kim Yong-sun
 Electoral District: Ri Son-sam
 Electoral District: Kim Kyong-su
 Electoral District: Choe Yong-tok
 Electoral District: 
 Electoral District: Choe Song-won
 Electoral District: An Chang-ryon
 Electoral District: Cho Chang-tok
 Electoral District: Jong Tae-ik
 Electoral District: Kim Pyong-hwa
 Electoral District: Kim Yong-il
 Electoral District: Cho Kang-chol
 Electoral District: Cho Jong-rim
 Electoral District: Chu Kyu-chang
 Electoral District: Kim Jong-un
 Electoral District: Chang Jae-chol
 Electoral District: Kim Pong-mo
 Electoral District: Choe Chun-sil
 Electoral District: Won Su-bok
 Electoral District: Hong Wan-thae
 Electoral District: Kang Tong-yun
 Electoral District: Choe Hu-yong
 Electoral District: Chon Kyong-son
 Electoral District: Choe Sun-ik
 Electoral District: Tak Pyong-kil
 Electoral District: Pyon Tok-sang
 Electoral District: Pae Tal-jun
 Electoral District: Ri Yong
 Electoral District: Kim Yong-ryeob
 Electoral District: Han Pong-un
 Electoral District: Kang Tung-cha
 Electoral District: Kim Yun-hyok
 Electoral District: Jong Yong-kap
 Electoral District: Chon Yon-ok
 Electoral District: Kim Phyong-hae
 Electoral District: Ri Sang-ryong
 Electoral District: Ri Jong-hyok
 Electoral District: Won Tong-ku
 Electoral District: Han Kuk-sung
 Electoral District: Nam Si-u
 Electoral District: Chang Chang-mun
 Electoral District: Yun Tong-hyon
 Electoral District: Kim Hui-son
 Electoral District: So Chun-yong
 Electoral District: Pak Mun-sik
 Electoral District: Pak Song-chun
 Electoral District: Ri Song-ung
 Electoral District: Kim Pyong-hun
 Electoral District: Ri Won-chol
 Electoral District: Kim Son-tan
 Electoral District: Pak Hwa-chun
 Electoral District: Choe Hak-kun
 Electoral District: Son Un-song
 Electoral District: Pak Song-sil
 Electoral District: Hyon Won-kuk
 Electoral District: Cha Myong-ok
 Electoral District: Sin Thae-uk
 Electoral District: Chang Yun-son
 Electoral District: Mun Pyong-kum
 Electoral District: An Yong-hyon
 Electoral District: Yang Hyong-sob
 Electoral District: Ri Je-son
 Electoral District: Paek Yong-il
 Electoral District: Kim Tae-sun
 Electoral District: Kim Song-hun
 Electoral District: Ri Jung-sob
 Electoral District: Pang Chol-sun
 Electoral District: Chang Jong-nam
 Electoral District: Cho Yun-hui
 Electoral District: Han Song-kyu
 Electoral District: Jong Chun-sil
 Electoral District: Pak Chang-il
 Electoral District: Chon Pyong-ho
 Electoral District: Sin Kwan-chin
 Electoral District: Ryom Hui-ryong
 Electoral District: Pyon Ryong-se
 Electoral District: Kim Chang-su
 Electoral District: Jong-ho
 Electoral District: Pak Son-ho
 Electoral District: Ho Song-chun
 Electoral District: Kim Il-sun
 Electoral District: Yon Hyong-muk
 Electoral District: Ri To-won
 Electoral District: Kang Won-jung
 Electoral District: Pak Myong-son
 Electoral District: Ri Tuk-nam
 Electoral District: Kim Chol-man
 Electoral District: Ro Hae-sun
 Electoral District: Pyon Thae-jun
 Electoral District: Kim In-suk
 Electoral District: Chang Se-jun
 Electoral District: Han Won-hwa
 Electoral District: Kim Chae-ran
 Electoral District: Choe Yong-il
 Electoral District: Kim Tong-son
 Electoral District: Kim Sun-yong
 Electoral District: Pak Song-ok
 Electoral District: Kang Hye-suk
 Electoral District: Kang Kwan-chu
 Electoral District: Ryu Sun-ae
 Electoral District: Pak Yong-hum
 Electoral District: Ri Yong-son
 Electoral District: Chi Sang-man
 Electoral District: Kim Yong-ok
 Electoral District: Kang Jong-pong
 Electoral District: Ho Nam-sun
 Electoral District: Kim Ki-nam
 Electoral District: Kim Chun-nyo
 Electoral District: Ri Pyong-uk
 Electoral District: Hwang Sun-hui
 Electoral District: Paek Chang-ryong
 Electoral District: Ri Song-yong
 Electoral District: Ri Kwang-hwi
 Electoral District: Chon Mun-sob
 Electoral District: Paek Nam-il
 Electoral District: Ri Song-kil
 Electoral District: Ri In-kyu
 Electoral District: Kim Ki-hwan
 Electoral District: Choe Chil-nam
 Electoral District: Won Chang-ryong
 Electoral District: Sin Won-kyu
 Electoral District: Kim Il-chan
 Electoral District: Jong Yon-hwa
 Electoral District: Han Si-hae
 Electoral District: Choe Hung-chu
 Electoral District: Jong Pong-hwa
 Electoral District: Jong Ok-tong
 Electoral District: Chi Jae-ryong
 Electoral District: Pak Thae-ho
 Electoral District: Ryang Su-jong
 Electoral District: An Kyong-ho
 Electoral District: Han Phil-hwa
 Electoral District: Han Cho-ung
 Electoral District: An Min-chol
 Electoral District: Choe Yol-hui
 Electoral District: Kim Pong-su
 Electoral District: Min Ung-sik
 Electoral District: Yun Ki-bok
 Electoral District: Choe Jong-kon
 Electoral District: Ko Jong-myong
 Electoral District: Kim Pyong-hwan
 Electoral District: Kim Un-ki
 Electoral District: Hwang Hwi-sang
 Electoral District: Choe Kwang-tok
 Electoral District: Ri Ha-sob
 Electoral District: Kim Bo-kyong
 Electoral District: Sung Sang-sob
 Electoral District: Ri Hyon-son
 Electoral District: Min Jong-sik
 Electoral District: Ri Jong-ok
 Electoral District: Ri Sun-ae
 Electoral District: Kye Yong-sam
 Electoral District: Ri Tok-jung
 Electoral District: Kim Yok-kyu
 Electoral District: Cho Tong-hwi
 Electoral District: Kim Sung-ok
 Electoral District: Kim Sang-ryon
 Electoral District: Ryang Kyong-bok
 Electoral District: Pak Thae-chin
 Electoral District: Paek Sol
 Electoral District: Kang Myong-ok
 Electoral District: Chang Myong-sil
 Electoral District: Kim Yong-nam
 Electoral District: Kim Thae-hong
 Electoral District: Cho Hye-suk
 Electoral District: Kang Yong-ho
 Electoral District: Kim Il-chol
 Electoral District: Kim Chin-hwa
 Electoral District: Ri In-ho
 Electoral District: Ro Pae-kwon
 Electoral District: Kim Jong-rok
 Electoral District: Ko Kyu-il
 Electoral District: Song Hyo-tal
 Electoral District: Choe Yong-kil
 Electoral District: O Kuk-ryol
 Electoral District: Hong Sok-hyong
 Electoral District: Sin Hyong-chin
 Electoral District: Ri Sang-chon
 Electoral District: Kim Yong-ae
 Electoral District: Ri Song-tae
 Electoral District: Kim Tok-jung
 Electoral District: Yun Chol
 Electoral District: Kim Pyong-song
 Electoral District: Kim Jong-ok
 Electoral District: Nam Sang-rak
 Electoral District: Ko Song-kun
 Electoral District: Pak Nam-gi
 Electoral District: Ri Yun-ryeob
 Electoral District: Choe Yong-song
 Electoral District: Song Son-pi
 Electoral District: Han Song-ryong
 Electoral District: Chu Ki-chan
 Electoral District: Ri Kwang-u
 Electoral District: Jong Song-thaek
 Electoral District: Chi Ok-sun
 Electoral District: Ri Thae-son
 Electoral District: Kim Kwang
 Electoral District: So Hyong-nam
 Electoral District: So Man-sul
 Electoral District: Ko Jong-ok
 Electoral District: Ri Kyong-sik
 Electoral District: Pak Myong-chol
 Electoral District: Pak Chang-yong
 Electoral District: Pong Chan-ho
 Electoral District: Pak Pom-rak
 Electoral District: Hong Sok-chin
 Electoral District: Hwang Jae-kyong
 Electoral District: O Myun-kun
 Electoral District: Han Tok-su
 Electoral District: Han Won-il
 Electoral District: Kwon Sun-ok
 Electoral District: Choe Hyong-kwan
 Electoral District: Han Hung-nam
 Electoral District: Kim Chin-kyu
 Electoral District: Kim Pyong-sik
 Electoral District: U Tu-thae
 Electoral District: Kim Tal-to
 Electoral District: Sok Kyong-su
 Electoral District: Ri Kum-sun
 Electoral District: Chae Hui-jong
 Electoral District: Choe Su-il
 Electoral District: Hwang Jong-hun
 Electoral District: Ri Chun-hwa
 Electoral District: Hong Jong-ku
 Electoral District: Yun Chol-ho
 Electoral District: Ri Myong-chol
 Electoral District: Jong Pyong-sang
 Electoral District: Cho Myong-rok
 Electoral District: Hwang Jong-un
 Electoral District: Kang Chol-ung
 Electoral District: Ko Jong-tok
 Electoral District: Ri Hyok-chol
 Electoral District: Chon Jae-son
 Electoral District: Kim Won-kyun
 Electoral District: Pak Yun-tuk
 Electoral District: Choe Myong-ae
 Electoral District: Im Chang-sun
 Electoral District: Ri Jong-mu
 Electoral District: Ho Yong-pom
 Electoral District: Choe Won-ik
 Electoral District: Kim Tok-yong
 Electoral District: Kim Hong-su
 Electoral District: Jong Ha-chol
 Electoral District: Kwon I-sun
 Electoral District: Pak Chong-il
 Electoral District: Kim Yong-ung
 Electoral District: Yom Ki-sun
 Electoral District: Pak Sam-ho
 Electoral District: Kim Je-tong
 Electoral District: Jong Mun-su
 Electoral District: Choe Wang-tae
 Electoral District: Ri Ui-hyon
 Electoral District: Chon Jong-sik
 Electoral District: Kim Su-hak
 Electoral District: Chon Hye-song
 Electoral District: Kwon Jong-hyob
 Electoral District: Kim Kwang-sob
 Electoral District: Chu Chang-jun
 Electoral District: Ko Son-ok
 Electoral District: An Sang-thaek
 Electoral District: Jong Tong-kun
 Electoral District: Son Ha-sik
 Electoral District: Paek Nam-jun
 Electoral District: An Pyong-mu
 Electoral District: Kim Bok-sin
 Electoral District: Choe Ki-ryong
 Electoral District: Ryo Won-ku
 Electoral District: Kim Bok-ryul
 Electoral District: Ri Won-su
 Electoral District: Kim Jong-sob
 Electoral District: Ri Thae-yon
 Electoral District: Ri Hong-sob
 Electoral District: Kim Pyong-ryul
 Electoral District: Kim Hwa-wol
 Electoral District: Choe Yong-kon
 Electoral District: Choe Chang-hak
 Electoral District: Kwon Sang-ho
 Electoral District: Rim Ki-yon
 Electoral District: Kim Yang-kun
 Electoral District: Sin An-son
 Electoral District: Cho Pyong-chu
 Electoral District: Han Jae-uk
 Electoral District: Ri Hyo-son
 Electoral District: Ri Kyong-sob
 Electoral District: Chang Myong-hak
 Electoral District: Jong Pyong-kon
 Electoral District: Ri Ki-sob
 Electoral District: Cho Tae-hi
 Electoral District: Jong Hui-chol
 Electoral District: Sin Song-u
 Electoral District: Hong Yong-ok
 Electoral District: Ri Pyong-chol
 Electoral District: Ri Chol-pong
 Electoral District: Ri Il-hwan
 Electoral District: Ho Jong-man
 Electoral District: Han Jong-kil
 Electoral District: Mun Yong-son
 Electoral District: Ri Chu-ung
 Electoral District: Kim Won-hong
 Electoral District: Ri Chang-hwa
 Electoral District: Ri Yong-ae
 Electoral District: Kim Sung-nam
 Electoral District: Han Tu-hyon
 Electoral District: Mun Kyong-tok
 Electoral District: Ryom Chol
 Electoral District: Han Tong-wan
 Electoral District: Chon Myong-hui
 Electoral District: Hong Tuk-ryong
 Electoral District: Kim Thae-ok
 Electoral District: Ri Mun-hwan
 Electoral District: Pak Ui-chun
 Electoral District: Kim Sang-pu
 Electoral District: Ri Yong-suk
 Electoral District: O Ki-sok
 Electoral District: Kim Yong-dae
 Electoral District: Han Chi-sol
 Electoral District: Kang Ryon-hak
 Electoral District: Ri Jong-san
 Electoral District: Choe Kwan-ung
 Electoral District: Cha Yong-phyo
 Electoral District: Ro Tu-chol
 Electoral District: Chang Sun-kum
 Electoral District: Kim Pung-ki
 Electoral District: Choe Thae-bok
 Electoral District: Kim Song-hun
 Electoral District: Pang Song-su
 Electoral District: Kang Yong-sob
 Electoral District: Ryom Sun-kil
 Electoral District: Choe Ung-su
 Electoral District: Chon Sung-hun
 Electoral District: Kim Pong-sik
 Electoral District: Ri Ha-il
 Electoral District: An Nong-sik
 Electoral District: Pak Yong-sok
 Electoral District: Sok Chol-u
 Electoral District: Ri Yong-ku
 Electoral District: Chang Son-ok
 Electoral District: Nam Song-rok
 Electoral District: Hwang Ok-son
 Electoral District: Pak Yong-il
 Electoral District: Kim Chang-kyu
 Electoral District: Cha Sung-su
 Electoral District: Yun Ki-jong
 Electoral District: Sin Tong-son
 Electoral District: Pak Yong-thae
 Electoral District: Jong Chong-sik
 Electoral District: Chon Kwang-rok
 Electoral District: Cho Se-ung
 Electoral District: Sin Yon-ok
 Electoral District: Cho Jong-ung
 Electoral District: Choe Kwan-jun
 Electoral District: Ri Jong-sik
 Electoral District: Tong Hun
 Electoral District: Kim Chun-kum
 Electoral District: Choe Yong-rim
 Electoral District: Chu Chun-sob
 Electoral District: Kim Hyong-chan
 Electoral District: Pak Min-chol
 Electoral District: Kim Pong-se
 Electoral District: Ko Ki-hun
 Electoral District: Nam Hui-jun
 Electoral District: Kim Min-suk
 Electoral District: Pak Chun-man
 Electoral District: Kim Jong-on
 Electoral District: Ri Jong-sik
 Electoral District: Ryo Kon-yo
 Electoral District: Song Kum-ok
 Electoral District: Kim Won-bok
 Electoral District: Kim Thae-pong
 Electoral District: Pak Su-kil
 Electoral District: Ko Hak-chin
 Electoral District: Phyo Il-sok
 Electoral District: Choe Hui-jong
 Electoral District: Ri Sang-chol
 Electoral District: Kim Kyong-hui
 Electoral District: Kim Song-ok
 Electoral District: Ri Su-bok
 Electoral District: Ri Sang-mu
 Electoral District: Ri Yong-mu
 Electoral District: Cha Sang-kwon
 Electoral District: Ri Won-ho
 Electoral District: Ri Jong-pom
 Electoral District: Sok Kil-ho
 Electoral District: Kim Jae-hwan
 Electoral District: Ri Kun-mo
 Electoral District: Ri Min-jong
 Electoral District: Kim Tong-kyun
 Electoral District: Kim Tong-han
 Electoral District: Ri Chang-won
 Electoral District: Kim Su-yol
 Electoral District: An Sam-chom
 Electoral District: Pak Chang-sik
 Electoral District: Pak Chol-ho
 Electoral District: Ri Yong-u
 Electoral District: Ri Tae-won
 Electoral District: Kang Sok-sung
 Electoral District: Mun Il-pong
 Electoral District: O I-jong
 Electoral District: Kim Myong-hui
 Electoral District: Ri Ki-hwa
 Electoral District: Ri Kong-phil
 Electoral District: Ri Ul-sol
 Electoral District: Chang In-suk
 Electoral District: Pak Kun-su
 Electoral District: Ri Il-nam
 Electoral District: Sim Sang-hu
 Electoral District: Rim Juk-son
 Electoral District: Kong Chin-thae
 Electoral District: Ri Su-kil
 Electoral District: Kim Yong-hyok
 Electoral District: Song Jong-su
 Electoral District: Ri Hyon-sob
 Electoral District: Kim Yong-sun
 Electoral District: Kim SIhak
 Electoral District: Kim Chan-bok
 Electoral District: Pak Kyong-suk
 Electoral District: Kim Il-san
 Electoral District: Kim Tae-kyom
 Electoral District: Kim Ik-hyon
 Electoral District: Kim Chang-hwan
 Electoral District: Kim Yong-chun
 Electoral District: Kim Hyo-kwan
 Electoral District: Choe In-tok
 Electoral District: Kim Kwang-ok
 Electoral District: Ri Yong-bok
 Electoral District: Pak Yong-ha
 Electoral District: Kim Yong-il
 Electoral District: Kim Yong-bok
 Electoral District: Pang Yong-tok
 Electoral District: Im Chun-sik
 Electoral District: Jong Myong-to
 Electoral District: O Se-in
 Electoral District: Kim Su-tok
 Electoral District: Ri Sung-hun
 Electoral District: Ko Myong-hui
 Electoral District: Jong Tu-chan
 Electoral District: Chang Chol
 Electoral District: Kye Ung-thae
 Electoral District: Kim Pyong-tok
 Electoral District: Ri Hye-chol
 Electoral District: Ri Ok-sang
 Electoral District: Kang Chol-su
 Electoral District: Mun Ung-cho
 Electoral District: Im Jong-sil
 Electoral District: Rim Ki-hwan
 Electoral District: Kang Phyo-yong
 Electoral District: Hyon Chol-hae
 Electoral District: Paek Sang-ho
 Electoral District: Chon Ki-ryon
 Electoral District: Tak Kum-chol
 Electoral District: Won Ung-hui
 Electoral District: Kim Kyok-sik
 Electoral District: Kim Yong-hui
 Electoral District: Chang Song-u
 Electoral District: Pak Jong-sik
 Electoral District: Chu Sang-song
 Electoral District: Kim Jong-kak
 Electoral District: Ryo Chun-sok
 Electoral District: Kim Song-kyu
 Electoral District: Pak Jae-kyong
 Electoral District: Ri Pong-juk
 Electoral District: Ri Yong-hwan
 Electoral District: Chon Chae-kwon
 Electoral District: Jong Hyo-kyun
 Electoral District: Ri Myong-su
 Electoral District: Pak Sung-won
 Electoral District: Kim Ryong-un
 Electoral District: Pak Song-ho
 Electoral District: O Kum-chol
 Electoral District: Kim Ki-son
 Electoral District: Sin Kum-yon
 Electoral District: Ri Phil-ryol
 Electoral District: Kim Yun-sim
 Electoral District: Jong Chang-ryol
 Electoral District: Kim Yong-nam
 Electoral District: Ri Thae-chol
 Electoral District: Choe Sang-ryo
 Electoral District: Ko Wan-myong
 Electoral District: Ri Jong-pu
 Electoral District: Kim Myong-kuk
 Electoral District: Ri Jong-man
 Electoral District: Kim Hyong-ryong
 Electoral District: Ri Hyong-ryong
 Electoral District: Kim Yang-chom
 Electoral District: Kim Jong-il
 Electoral District: Ri Yong-kil
 Electoral District: Choe Pu-il
 Electoral District: An Pi-tuk
 Electoral District: Kim Yong-chol
 Electoral District: Kim Ha-kyu
 Electoral District: O Ryong-pang
 Electoral District: Ri Pyong-sam
 Electoral District: Yun Yong-kil
 Electoral District: Choe Song-su
 Electoral District: Pak Yong-kon
 Electoral District: Kim Chang-song
 Electoral District: Han Pae-nyon
 Electoral District: Ri Jae-yon
 Electoral District: Cho Myong-chol
 Electoral District: Pae Tok-hwan
 Electoral District: Chae Mun-tok
 Electoral District: Ri Yong-chol
 Electoral District: Kim Chi-tok
 Electoral District: Kim Jong-nam
 Electoral District: Ri Un-ryong
 Electoral District: Pak In-yong(박인영)

Notes

References

Elections in North Korea
North Korea
Parliamentary
Supreme People's Assembly
Election and referendum articles with incomplete results